Luciano Federico Sánchez (born 25 January 1994) is an Argentine professional footballer who plays as a right-back for Argentinos Juniors.

Career
Sánchez started his career with Independiente Rivadavia. He made his professional debut on 6 June 2015 against Juventud Unida, which was one of twelve appearances in 2015 in Primera B Nacional. Just one appearance followed in 2016, though Sánchez did play twelve times in 2016–17 as he also scored his opening career goal - netting in a 0–2 away victory versus Villa Dálmine in July 2017.

Career statistics
.

References

External links

1994 births
Living people
Sportspeople from Mendoza Province
Argentine footballers
Association football defenders
Primera Nacional players
Independiente Rivadavia footballers
Argentinos Juniors footballers